"I'll Be Fine" is a song by Swedish singer Molly Pettersson Hammar. It was released on 7 February 2015 as a digital download in Sweden. The song was written by Molly Pettersson Hammar, Lisa Desmond, Tim Larsson, Tobias Lundgren and Gavin Jones. The song took part in Melodifestivalen 2015, and was eliminated from the first semi-final on 7 February 2015, placing sixth. The song subsequently peaked at number 65 on the Swedish Singles Chart. The song also reached number one on the Swedish iTunes chart and peaked at number six on Digilistan (The Swedish download chart).

Track listing

Charts

Release history

References

2014 songs
2015 singles
Melodifestivalen songs of 2015
English-language Swedish songs
Songs written by Tim Larsson
Songs written by Tobias Lundgren
Warner Music Group singles
Molly Pettersson Hammar songs